The northern Somali leaf-toed gecko (Hemidactylus somalicus) is a species of gecko. It is found in Somaliland and Ethiopia.

References

Hemidactylus
Reptiles of Ethiopia
Reptiles of Somalia
Reptiles described in 1932
Taxa named by Hampton Wildman Parker